The Protocol to Eliminate Illicit Trade in Tobacco Products is a 2012 World Health Organization treaty designed to combat the worldwide illicit tobacco trade. The Protocol is supplementary to the WHO Framework Convention on Tobacco Control.

Description 

The Protocol was concluded on 12 November 2012 in Seoul at the fifth session of the Conference of the Parties to the WHO Framework Convention on Tobacco Control. It was opened for signature on 10 January 2013 and remained so until 9 January 2014. It was signed by 54 states and as September 2018 has been ratified by or acceded to by 58 parties. The Protocol entered into force on 25 September 2018 after being ratified by its 40th state. Only parties that have ratified the Framework Convention may ratify the Protocol.

The Protocol contains provisions which require a ratifying state to take a variety of measures regarding the tobacco trade, including licensing; tracking and tracing; record-keeping; monitoring and regulating sales by Internet; international transit; and duty-free sales. The Protocol also promotes international co-operation in information sharing, mutual legal assistance, and extradition of persons suspected of involvement in the illicit tobacco trade.

Once it has entered into force, the Protocol will be monitored by the Meeting of the Parties which convenes every other year immediately following the FCTC Conference of the parties.

External links
Protocol to Eliminate Illicit Trade in Tobacco Products, WHO information page
Text
Signatures and ratifications

Protocol to Eliminate Illicit Trade in Tobacco Products
Protocol to Eliminate Illicit Trade in Tobacco Products
Treaties concluded in 2012
Treaties entered into force in 2018
Treaties of Austria
Treaties of Benin
Treaties of Brazil
Treaties of Burkina Faso
Treaties of Chad
Treaties of the Comoros
Treaties of the Republic of the Congo
Treaties of Costa Rica
Treaties of Cyprus
Treaties of Ecuador
Treaties entered into by the European Union
Treaties of France
Treaties of Gabon
Treaties of the Gambia
Treaties of Germany
Treaties of Guinea
Treaties of India
Treaties of Iran
Treaties of Iraq
Treaties of Ivory Coast
Treaties of Latvia
Treaties of Lithuania
Treaties of Madagascar
Treaties of Mali
Treaties of Malta
Treaties of Mauritius
Treaties of Mongolia
Treaties of Nicaragua
Treaties of Niger
Treaties of Pakistan
Treaties of Panama
Treaties of Paraguay
Treaties of Portugal
Treaties of Qatar
Treaties of Samoa
Treaties of Saudi Arabia
Treaties of Senegal
Treaties of Serbia
Treaties of Slovakia
Treaties of Spain
Treaties of Sri Lanka
Treaties of Eswatini
Treaties of Togo
Treaties of Turkey
Treaties of Turkmenistan
Treaties of the United Kingdom
Treaties of Uruguay
World Health Organization treaties